Arim may refer to:
 Arim, Neka
 Arim, Savadkuh